The Sean J. Kennedy Quartet is an American Jazz group based in Philadelphia, Pennsylvania.

Discography

Road to Wailea
Queen Anne's Revenge
Outta' Here!
Hey! Where's My Tux?!

Members

Sean J. Kennedy, Drums, Primary Artist, Producer  
Erin Stroup, Saxophone, Composer 
John Stenger, Piano 
Mark Amentt, Bass

Guest Artists

Liberty DeVitto, Drums 
Tim Price, Saxophone 
Dave Champion, Trombone 
Bob Wagner, Trumpet 
Bob Mintzer, Tenor Saxophone 
Larry McKenna, Tenor Saxophone 
Gary Zimarro, Saxophone and Flute

Former members

Jim Sullivan, Piano 
Raymond Clemens, Bass

References

American jazz ensembles from Pennsylvania